On 24 May 2014, Jacob Zuma was inaugurated as the President of the Republic of South Africa for his second term in office. Shortly after, on 25 May 2014, he announced his new cabinet. While some ministers from the previous cabinet retained their posts, most of the cabinet was made up of either new appointments or previous cabinet ministers shifted to new portfolios. There were a total of 35 ministerial portfolios in the cabinet. Zuma subsequently reshuffled the cabinet on several occasions during his second term in office, including a major reshuffle on 30 March 2017.

Ministers

References

Government of South Africa
Executive branch of the government of South Africa
Cabinets of South Africa
2014 establishments in South Africa
Cabinets established in 2014
2018 disestablishments in South Africa
Cabinets disestablished in 2018